Rico Elliott Anderson is an American film and television actor who has appeared in over 90 TV shows, films, and commercials.

Early life
Anderson was born in Seaside, California and is the oldest of eleven children on his mother's side (6 biological and 5 adopted), and the 3rd of 4 children oh his father's side. He was born in Seaside/Monterey, CA and was raised on the south side of Chicago, as well as in the San Francisco Bay Area.

Career
Following his graduation, Anderson moved to Los Angeles to pursue a full-time acting career. He acted in the award-winning documentary Mighty Times: The Children's March in 2005.  In 2010 he performed in the play The Ballad of Emmett Till at the Fountain Theatre in Los Angeles. He also performed in the play Dessalines (The Heart) Blood and Liberation.

In 2015 Anderson played the role of Boras in the film Star Trek: Renegades. He received a "best actor" award in 2016 at the Pasadena International Film Festival for his role in the film Dreams My Master. In 2017 he hosted the Third Annual Short Film Awards ceremony in New York.

Select filmography

Film

Television

References

External links

African-American male actors
American male television actors
American male film actors
San Francisco State University alumni
Living people
Year of birth missing (living people)
21st-century African-American people